Krasimira Tocheva (born 28 July 1967) is a Bulgarian rower. She competed in the women's quadruple sculls event at the 1988 Summer Olympics.

References

External links
 

1967 births
Living people
Bulgarian female rowers
Olympic rowers of Bulgaria
Rowers at the 1988 Summer Olympics
Rowers from Sofia